"The Autumn Wind" is a sports-themed poem adapted from Mary Jane Carr's "Pirate Wind" by former NFL Films President and co-founder Steve Sabol (son of founder Ed Sabol) describing the atmosphere of autumn weather, as it relates to pro football season. It is synonymous with the National Football League (NFL)'s Las Vegas Raiders, and is often heard blaring out of the speakers at Raider games. Narrated by John Facenda, this 1974 production has been dubbed "The Battle Hymn of the Raider Nation".

The poem was first used for the team's official team yearbook film in 1974, of the same title, and also for NFL Films' hour-long recap of the 1974 season. Legend has it that when Raider owner and managing general partner Al Davis heard "The Autumn Wind" song for the first time, he remained silent for a second before telling then NFL Films President Ed Sabol that he loved it, and that "it epitomized everything that the Raiders stood for". 

It has been used on numerous official NFL Films audio album soundtracks, most notably The Power & The Glory LP, featuring Facenda narrating over it, as well as numerous other tracks composed and conducted by Sam Spence and played by the NFL Films Orchestra. Rapper, actor and Raider fan Ice Cube uses the first and last quartets to introduce his song Raider Nation, the theme for Straight Outta L.A., his ESPN 30 for 30 documentary about how the Raiders' time in Los Angeles coincided with, among other things, the rise of N.W.A. and hip hop in Los Angeles.

References

External links
 Autumn Wind: An Ode to the History of the Raiders (via NFL Films' YouTube channel)

Las Vegas Raiders
Oakland Raiders
NFL Films
1974 poems
American poems
San Francisco Bay Area literature